Kindling is material for firelighting

Kindling may also refer to:
 Kindling (album), a 1973 album by Gene Parsons
 Kindling (film), a 1915 film by Cecil B. DeMille
 Kindling (Mick Farren novel)
 Ruined City (novel) or Kindling, a novel by Nevil Shute
 Kindling (substance withdrawal), a process by which each subsequent withdrawal episode produces a more severe withdrawal syndrome
 Kindling, a campus humor magazine for North Central College